Tribia is a genus of sea snails, marine gastropod mollusks in the family Cancellariidae, the nutmeg snails.

Species
Species within the genus Tribia include:
 Tribia angasi (Crosse, 1863)
 Tribia coronata (Scacchi, 1835)
Species brought into synonymy 
 Tribia epomis Woodring, 1928 : synonym of Agatrix epomis (Woodring, 1928)

References

 Verhecken A. (2007). Revision of the Cancellariidae (Mollusca, Neogastropoda, Cancellarioidea) of the eastern Atlantic (40°N-40°S) and the Mediterranean. Zoosystema : 29(2): 281-364
 Hemmen J. (2007). Recent Cancellariidae. Wiesbaden, 428pp

External links

Cancellariidae
Gastropod genera
Taxa named by Félix Pierre Jousseaume